A jay is a kind of colorful, noisy bird in the crow family.

Jay may also refer to:

People
 Jay (given name)
 Jay (surname)
 Jay (French singer) (born 1979), R&B singer in trio Vigon Bamy Jay
 Jay (South African singer), stage name of South African singer Jaco du Plessis
 Jay (South Korean singer) (born 1983), stage name of singer Kim Kyun-woo
 Jay-Z (born 1969), stage name of American rapper Shawn Corey Carter

Characters
 Jay (The Dumping Ground character)
 Jay (View Askewniverse)

Place names

United Kingdom
 Jay, Herefordshire

United States
 Jay, Florida
 Jay City, Indiana
 Jay, Maine
 Jay, New York
 Jay, Oklahoma
 Jay, Vermont
 Jay County, Indiana
 Jay Township (disambiguation), multiple locations

Iran
Jay (Gay), ancient twin town of Isfahan, Persia

Other uses
 J, a letter in the Latin alphabet
 Jay (album), 2000 album by Jay Chou
 Joint (cannabis), a cigarette rolled from marijuana
 Jay (locomotive), a South Devon Railway 0-4-0 steam locomotive
 Jays Foods, a manufacturer of snack foods
 Jay Funeral Home, listed on the National Register of Historic Places in Wapello County, Iowa, US
 Jaywalking, crossing the road where not allowed
 Toronto Blue Jays, a Canadian professional baseball team
 Jay, a large, metallic blue-green swallowtail butterfly in the genus Graphium

See also

 
 J (disambiguation)
 Jay Jay (disambiguation)
 Jay bird (disambiguation)
 Blue jay (disambiguation)